Santa María la Mayor is the Spanish term for Holy Mary the Major or the Greatest, and is the equivalent of the Italian term Santa Maria Maggiore. As a Marian devotion, it is a common name for churches and sites, including:

Spain

Santa María la Mayor, Alcañiz 
Santa María la Mayor, Alcaudete 
Real Colegiata de Santa María la Mayor, Antequera
Santa María la Mayor, Caspe, Aragon
Santa María la Mayor del Pilar, Caspe, Aragon
Santa María la Mayor, Calatayud, Aragon
Co-cathedral of Santa María la Mayor, Emerita Augusta
Santa María la Mayor, Épila 
Santa María la Mayor, Híjar
Santa María la Mayor, Salas, Asturias
Santa María la Mayor, Toro 
Santa María la Mayor, Villamuriel de Cerrato
Santa María la Mayor, Villanueva de Gómez (ruins)
Santa María la Mayor, Zamora

Argentina
Reducción de Santa María la Mayor, Argentina